Kenneth Jackson Jr. (February 17, 1975 – October 13, 1996), stage name G-Slimm, was a gangsta rapper from New Orleans, Louisiana. His debut album Fours Deuces & Trays was released in 1994 on New Orleans independent rap label Big Boy Records and was produced by Leroy "Precise" Edwards. Fours Deuces & Trays was a huge success and he was on the verge of signing a major deal with Relativity Records in 1995–1997. He was shot and killed in a triple shooting in 1996, before he could sign to Relativity.

Biography
Born Kenneth Jackson Jr. in 1975, he was raised in the Christopher Homes area which is located in the  Algiers neighborhood of New Orleans. As a teenager he began rapping and was discovered by Charles "Big Boy" Temple in 1992. He was signed the next year to Big Boy Records along with Mystikal, Black Menace and Partners-N-Crime. Jackson dropped k from his name adopting the G and began doing features as G-Slimm. His debut album Fours Deuces & Trays was released on September 3, 1994, and featured, Mystikal who also made his debut on the album. Leroy "Precise" Edwards produced the tracks on the album, giving it a West Coast southern feel. The album sold well over 200,000 copies the first month, becoming the most acclaimed local rap albums of 1994. Due to the identical track layout format, it was often compared with Dr. Dre.'s The Chronic album. It was the first album produced in New Orleans to have a California G-Funk sound, relevant to G-Funk area of the mid-1990s. The following year Jackson was offered a deal by Relativity Records. While working on his sophomore album titled G-Slimm for Relativity, he was murdered before it hit the stores. His last feature was with close friend rapper Tim Smooth on his album "Da Franchise." Da Franchise was released in 1998 two years after his death. G-Slimm's vocals was also featured on Big Boy's 1997 compilation album "We G's".

Death
On October 13, 1996, Jackson and three other men were walking from the Christopher Homes Housing Development on Murl Street when unknown gunmen fired shots at them at 1:30 pm. All three men were hit including G-Slimm who shot once in the back. Jackson was later pronounced dead at 2:14 pm at Charity Hospital.

Discography

References

1975 births
1996 deaths
Rappers from New Orleans
Gangsta rappers
20th-century American rappers
African-American male rappers
20th-century American male musicians
20th-century African-American musicians
Deaths by firearm in Louisiana